Richmond College is a primary and secondary school in Galle, Sri Lanka which was established as Galle High School in 1876. The founder of school was the Wesleyan Missionary George Bough. The first principal of the school was Rev Samuel Langdon. In 1882, it was renamed Richmond College. Richmond College is the first Wesleyan Methodist school to be established in Asia. The former school of Richmond College known as the 'Galle School' dates back to July 1814.

Founding (Unofficial)
The first missionaries from the Wesleyan Methodist Church to Ceylon were led by the Rev. Dr Thomas Coke, and consisted of William Ault, James Lynch, George Erskine, William Martin Harvard, Thomas Hall Squance and John Mckenny, leaving England on 30 December 1813. During their journey, Coke died at sea on 2 May. They reached Ceylon on 29 June 1814. 
 
They held an inaugural church service on 3 July 1814 at the Old Dutch Church at Galle Fort. Governor Robert Brownrigg, sent his brother-in-law, Rev Bisset, the senior colonial chaplain, to meet and confer with the missionaries, inviting the missionaries to establish schools for the Ceylonese.
 
Following a conference on 11 July, Benjamin Clough (1791-1853) was elected to take charge of the Galle station. Subsequently, Clough was visited by the Maha Mudaliyár of Galle, Don Abraham Dias Abeysinghe Amarasekera, on 25 July 1814, who upon hearing that Clough was going to establish a school offered his deceased brother's house to be used for the school. The house, 'Doornberg', located on Upper Dickson Road, was built by the Dutch in 1712. 
 
According to Clough’s journal, which was archived in the School of African Studies (SOAS) at the University of London, he personally notes -
 

 
Mission documents record,  
 
The school had only five children and one adult, the Mudaliyár himself. It was initially an English school, the Galle School, and then subsequently became known as Galle Boys’ School or as Galle English School.

History 
The first College magazine was published in 1887. It was only the second occasion that a school in Ceylon had produced a magazine. The same year, the English Literary Union was formed and cricket was started in the school. In 1894, under the principal-ship of Horatius Hartley, the Richmond College Old Boys' Association was formed. Another important occurrence during that year was the establishment of the College Cadet Corps. Main Hall James Horne Darrel assumed duties as principal in 1896. The school experienced both physical expansion as well as qualitative growth. During his period, Richmond rose to be recognised as one of the best schools in the island. At the local University of Cambridge Examinations of 1905, Richmond earned a top position among assisted schools and second place among all schools in Ceylon. The same year, the Richmond-Mahinda Cricket Encounter was played for the first time, with the two principals, Darrell of Richmond and F. L. Woodward of Mahinda College, officiating as umpires. Darrell sacrificed his life for the college nursing the pupils who were afflicted with 'typhoid' when there was an outbreak in the country and was buried at the Dadalla Cemetery, Galle. W. J. T. Small became principal following the death of Darrell. Darrell and Small are the only two principals of Richmond who have been buried side by side and both principals met with their deaths under tragic circumstances; the former due to typhoid fever and the latter due to an accident.

Commerce was introduced as a subject in 1912. This was also the year in which football was started at Richmond. In 1915, the 2nd Galle (Richmond) Scouts Group was established. Scouting at Richmond College enjoyed remarkable success from the beginning. The first two King's Scouts in the island were produced by Richmond. In 1916, Ceylon's first cub pack was started at Richmond College. A notable event during the Small's period was the formation of the National Association at Richmond in 1915. It was in effect a forum within the school for the emerging nationalist movement. In 1922, Alec Sneath took over the reins of Richmond College. He was responsible for many measures which brought refinement and qualitative development to the school. In 1926, a well-equipped library was established in a new building. The Science Society was started the same year. In 1931, the Sinhala Literary Union came into being.

In 1940, the last of the missionary principals left, leaving the school in the hands of local graduates. E. R. de Silva, an old boy (alumni) of the school, had the distinction of becoming the first Ceylonese principal of Richmond College. This was a period which saw major changes in the educational structure of Ceylon. The Free Education Scheme which was devised by C. W. W. Kannangara, an old boy of Richmond College, was being implemented, and the school had to be geared to suit the changes. The history of Richmond are from original Mission Records held in the Methodist Mission Library, in Colombo and in England.

In 1962, Richmond College, which was owned by the Methodist Mission, was vested in the government with no compensation to the Mission. D. G. Welikala, the first head of Richmond College under state management, was also its first Buddhist principal. With the takeover, the Methodist Vernacular School on Richmond Hill was amalgamated with Richmond. This school was referred to as the "Kaha Iskole (කහ ඉස්කෝලේ)" by some and "Pin Iskole (පිං ඉස්කෝලෙ)" meaning Charity school by others has been in existence from the time the Missionaries established a learning seat on Richmond Hill in 1858. During this period, considerable expansion and change had to take place to cater to the new situation. Richmond College faced the challenge of transition so successfully that the then Minister of Education commended Richmond on several occasions, describing it as a model institution among nationalised schools.

Richmond College was one of the first schools in the island to start teaching agriculture as a subject. In 1969, it became the first school in the country to start an agricultural stream for the Advanced Level. In 1976, the College celebrated its centenary of upgrading. In terms of the provisions of the White Paper on Education, Richmond College was named a National School in 1986. Richmond College Old Boys' Association was incorporated in 1998 by Act #04 of Parliament of Sri Lanka.

Principals

The following are the heads of the school from 1876, to-date
 	Samuel Langdon (1876 – 1879)
 	Robert Tebb BSc (London) MA(Cantab)(1879)
 	Samuel Hill (1879 – 1882)
 	Samuel R. Wilkins (1882 – 1888)
 	Arthur Triggs (1888 – 1893)
 	Horatius Hartley (1893 – 1896)
 	James Horne Darrell BSc(Cambs) MA(Cantab) (1896 – 1906)
Percy T. Cash (1914 – 1915)
 	W. J. T. Small (1906 – 1922)
 	Alec A. Sneath MA(Manch) (1922 – 1939)
 	John Dalby MA(Oxon) (1939 – 1940)
 	E. R. de Silva MA (1940 – 1957), first Ceylonese principal
 	A. Shelton Wirasinghe BA (1957 – 1961)
 	Claude Ivor de Silva BA (1961), acting

Richmond College (1962 onwards) 
	D. G. Welikala (1962–1971), the first principal after nationalisation
	J. Munasinghe (1971–1973)
       S. Kariyawasam (1973–1977)
	N. P. G. Amarakeerthi (1978–1979)
	B. Suriarachchi (1979–1986)
	S. Illayperuma (1986–1994)
	W. N. R. P. Daniyas (1994–2004)
	G. V. S. B. Shanthasiri (2004–2008)
	E. M. S. Ekanayake (2008–2015)
       Sampath Weragoda (2015–2020)
   Thilak Waththuhewa (2020–2021)
   W. P. Niluka Dilruk Weerasinghe (2021–2022)
   P. S. Pushpakumara (2022–Present)

Cricket

The annual cricket match between Richmond College and Mahinda College is known as "the lovers' quarrel". It is one of the longest cricket match series in Sri Lanka, having been played for over 114 years. The match which is also known as the "Lovers' Quarrel" in public, is played at the Galle International Stadium. The Lovers' Quarrel was begun in 1905, under the two principals Rev. James Horne Darrel of Richmond College and Sir. Frank Lee Woodward of Mahinda College.

Notable alumni

References

Boys' schools in Sri Lanka
Cambridge schools in Sri Lanka
Former Methodist schools in Sri Lanka
National schools in Sri Lanka
Schools in Galle